Eric Isaiah Mobley (born September 24, 1999) is an American professional basketball player for the Cleveland Cavaliers of the National Basketball Association (NBA), on a two-way contract with the Cleveland Charge of the NBA G League. He played college basketball for the USC Trojans. He attended Rancho Christian School in Temecula, California, where he was a five-star recruit and McDonald's All-American. He was named first-team All-Pac-12 as a junior with USC.

High school career
Mobley attended Rancho Christian School in Temecula, California. As a freshman, he won the CIF Southern Section (CIF-SS) Division 5A title, the school's first in any sport, and led his team to the CIF Division V Southern California Regional final. After averaging 16.2 points and 10.4 rebounds per game, Mobley shared CIF-SS Division 5A player of the year honors and made The Press-Enterprise All-Area second team. Over the summer, he played for the Compton Magic, one of the top travel teams in the country.

As a sophomore, Mobley was joined on the Rancho Christian basketball team by his younger brother Evan Mobley. He helped his team reach the CIF-SS Division 2A semifinal. In his junior season, Mobley averaged 19.9 points, 11.3 rebounds, and four assists per game and was named The Press-Enterprise player of the year and made the USA Today All-USA California second team and MaxPreps Junior All-American honorable mention team. He guided Rancho Christian to a 29–5 record and a CIF-SS Open Division playoff appearance. As a senior, Mobley averaged 19.4 points, 13.6 rebounds, and 3.8 assists per game, helping his team to a 26–6 record. He earned honorable mention on the MaxPreps All-American and USA Today All-USA teams, while making the All-USA California first team. Mobley played in the 2019 McDonald's All-American Game.  Mobley at one point in high school was projected to be the second pick of the 2020 NBA Draft like his brother Evan Mobley was projected to be in the 2021 NBA Draft.

Recruiting
Mobley received offers from several NCAA Division I programs, including San Diego State and Nevada, before starting high school. On May 28, 2018, as a high school junior, he committed to playing college basketball for USC. By the end of his high school career, Mobley was considered a consensus five-star recruit and the best 2019 class prospect in California.

College career
In his debut for USC, Mobley had 17 points and seven rebounds to lead the Trojans to a 77–48 victory over Florida A&M. He had 15 points and nine rebounds in a 101–79 loss to Marquette on November 29, 2019. Mobley made eight starts as a freshman and averaged 6.2 points and 5.3 rebounds per game. As a sophomore, he averaged 9.9 points and 7.3 rebounds per game. On April 17, 2021, he declared for the 2021 NBA draft while maintaining his college eligibility; he withdrew from the draft in July on the day of the deadline. As a junior, he averaged 14.2 points, 8.3 rebounds and 3.3 assists per game. Mobley was named first-team All-Pac-12 as a junior. On April 11, 2022, Mobley declared for the 2022 NBA draft, forgoing his remaining college eligibility.

Professional career

Cleveland Cavaliers (2022–present)
Mobley was selected with the 49th overall pick by the Cleveland Cavaliers. On July 2, 2022, the Cavaliers signed him to a two-way contract. Under the terms of the deal, he split time between the Cavaliers and their NBA G League affiliate, the Cleveland Charge. Mobley was named to the G League's inaugural Next Up Game for the 2022–23 season.

Career statistics

College

|-
| style="text-align:left;"| 2019–20
| style="text-align:left;"| USC
| 31 || 8 || 20.3 || .474 || .286 || .521 || 5.3 || 1.0 || .6 || .6 || 6.2
|-
| style="text-align:left;"| 2020–21
| style="text-align:left;"| USC
| 32 || 32 || 28.0 || .472 || .436 || .545 || 7.3 || 1.6 || .4 || .9 || 9.9
|-
| style="text-align:left;"| 2021–22
| style="text-align:left;"| USC
| 32 || 32 || 34.1 || .445 || .352 || .682 || 8.3 || 3.3 || .8 || .9 || 14.2
|- class="sortbottom"
| style="text-align:center;" colspan="2"| Career
| 95 || 72 || 27.5 || .460 || .360 || .596 || 7.0 || 2.0 || .6 || .8 || 10.1

Personal life
Mobley's father Eric played college basketball for Cal Poly Pomona and Portland and played professionally in China, Indonesia, Mexico, and Portugal. He later coached Amateur Athletic Union (AAU) basketball for 11 years. In 2018, he was hired as assistant basketball coach for USC. Mobley's younger brother Evan, with whom he played in high school and college, were drafted by the same NBA team (Cavaliers) one year apart.

References

External links

USC Trojans bio

1999 births
Living people
21st-century African-American sportspeople
American men's basketball players
African-American basketball players
Basketball players from San Diego
Cleveland Cavaliers draft picks
Cleveland Cavaliers players
McDonald's High School All-Americans
Power forwards (basketball)
USC Trojans men's basketball players